Samiha Ayoub is an Egyptian actress known for her work on stage, in film and on television. In 2015, she received the Nile Award in the Arts, and in the same year, the large hall in the National Theater was named after her, in honour of her outstanding career in cinema and theater, and her contributions to the theatrical arts in Egypt.

Biography 
Samiha Ayoub was born in Shubra, Cairo in 1932. She graduated from the Nun's School then joined the Acting Institute in 1952. Her breakthrough came after her role in Samara and Rabaa ElAdawya (radio series). She has been married three times, to actor Mohsen Sarhan, actor Mahmoud Morsy, and playwright Sa’ed Eddine Wihbe (Saad Eddin Wehbe).

Professional life 
From 1972 to 1975, Ayoub managed The Modern Theatre, and from 1975 to 1985, she was the director of Al-Qawmy Theatre. She acted in the famous television miniseries El Miraya alongside Salah Zulfikar in 1984.

Plays 
 Al-Bakheel (The Miser)
 Kobry Al-Namoos (Mosquito Bridge)
 Sikkat Al-Salama (The Right Way)

Films 
 Motashareda
 Shatea Al-Gharam Wal Wahsh
 Bein El Atlal (1959)
 Tita Rahiba (2012)
 El-Leila El-Kebira (2015)

Television 
 El Miraya (1984)

References  

Living people
1932 births
Actresses from Cairo
Egyptian film actresses
Egyptian theatre directors
Women theatre directors